Edward John Vereb (May 21, 1934 – December 18, 2014) was an American football halfback in the Canadian Football League (CFL) with the BC Lions and the National Football League (NFL) for the Washington Redskins.  He played college football at the University of Maryland and was drafted in the first round of the 1956 NFL Draft. He played 4 seasons with the B.C. Lions, being named an all-star in 1956.

In 1961, the BC Lions hired Vereb as its backfield coach.  He died from complications of Alzheimer's disease in 2014.

References

External links
 

1934 births
2014 deaths
American football halfbacks
Canadian football running backs
American players of Canadian football
Maryland Terrapins football players
Washington Redskins players
Players of American football from Pittsburgh
Players of Canadian football from Pittsburgh
Sportspeople from Pittsburgh
BC Lions coaches
BC Lions players
Central Catholic High School (Pittsburgh) alumni